Murray High School is a government-funded co-educational comprehensive secondary day school, located in , New South Wales, Australia. 

Established in 1976, the school enrolled approximately 650 students in 2018, from Year 7 to Year 12, of whom 9 per cent identify as Indigenous Australians and 10 per cent from a language background other than English. The school is operated by the NSW Department of Education; and the current principal is Norman Johnson-Meader.

The inaugural principal of Murray High School was H. Lyle Ingram (1976–1981).

Facilities 
Murray High school's facilities include:
 Five computer rooms
 Eight work rooms for the visual arts, woodwork, metalwork and technical drawing disciplines
 Six science laboratories with all necessary equipment
 Two industrial kitchens, fully equipped
 Music and drama faculties
 Twenty class rooms
 A computerised library with study areas and extensive resource collections
 A multipurpose gymnasium, basketball courts, cricket nets, hockey field and an oval
 All rooms except woodwork and metalwork are equipped with projectors

Notable alumni 
 Angela Iannottaformer soccer player and now soccer coach; represented the Matildas
 Lauren Jackson former basketball player; represented Australia at the 2000 Sydney and 2004 Athens Olympics; captained the Opals
 Lee Kernaghan country music singer, songwriter and guitarist
 Brett Kirkformer Australian rules footballer and now coach; played with and captained the Sydney Swans
 Carly FindlayAustralian writer and speaker; activist on disability issues
 Tony Armstrong (Australian rules footballer)

See also 

 List of government schools in New South Wales
 List of schools in the Riverina
 Education in Australia

References

External links
 

Public high schools in New South Wales
1976 establishments in Australia
Educational institutions established in 1976
Education in the Riverina